Peter Bhatia is an American journalist and the editor of the Detroit Free Press. He was previously the editor of The Oregonian.

References 

Year of birth missing (living people)
Living people
Detroit Free Press people
The Oregonian people